The Ministry of Economics of the Republic of Latvia is the leading state administrative institution responsible for economic policy in Latvia. The ministry also represents the economic interests of Latvia in the European Union.

Minister for Economics
The current minister since May 26, 2022, is Ilze Indriksone from the National Alliance.

Functions
The ministry develops and implements economic structural policy, manufacturing policy, energy policy, external economic policy, domestic market policy (for goods and services), commercial development policy, competitiveness and technological development policy, consumer rights protection policy, and construction and housing policy. To achieve these ends, the ministry works closely with non-governmental organizations representing entrepreneurs and other social partners.

EU Structural Funds
The Ministry of Economics is also responsible for introducing and supervising programs and projects for EU Structural Funds. These funds are administered by the Investment and Development Agency of Latvia, a government agency responsible for promoting business development in Latvia by facilitating the growth of foreign investment and increasing the competitiveness of Latvian entrepreneurs in domestic and foreign markets. The Investment and Development Agency of Latvia is directly subordinated to the Ministry of Economics.

Subordinated institutions
The Ministry of Economics oversees several government agencies in Latvia: the Investment and Development Agency of Latvia, Latvian Tourism Development Agency, the Central Statistical Bureau of Latvia, Competition Council, Consumer Rights Protection Center, and Public Utilities Commission.

See also
 Economy of Latvia

References

External links
 Ministry of Economics website
 Investment and Development Agency of Latvia website
 Latvian Tourism Development Agency website 
 Central Statistical Bureau of Latvia website

Latvia
Government of Latvia